The Order of Merit is a Portuguese Honorific Order of civil merit intended to award those responsible for meritorious acts or services performed in the exercise of any functions, both in the public and the private sphere, which reveal self-sacrifice in favor of the community. The decorations are given by the President of the Portuguese Republic, in his role as the Grand-Master of the Portuguese Honorific Orders. The Order of Merit can be awarded, during life or posthumously, to both Portuguese and foreign citizens; it can also be awarded to localities or institutions that are legal persons governed by public law or of public utility. This order has been awarded to a number of people performing the most diverse functions such as ambassadors, businesspeople, military personnel, athletes and musicians.

History
The Order of Merit has its origin in April 1927, when the Order of Instruction and Benefaction (Original Portuguese: Ordem da Instrução e da Benemerência) was created. The goal of this now extinct order was to distinguish the services performed by people or corporations in order to further the instruction in the country. In 1929, the Order of Instruction and Benefaction was split in two different orders, the Order of Benefaction and the Order of Public Instruction, with the former now solely awarding acts related to social causes, public assistance and goodwill. In 1976, the order was renamed to its current title.

Grades
  Grand Cross (GCM) (Grã-Cruz)
  Grand Officer (GOM) (Grande-Oficial)
  Commander (ComM) (Comendador or Comendadeira)
  Officer (OM) (Oficial)
  Medal (MedM) (Medalha)
 Honorary Member (MHM) (Membro Honorário)

Notable recipients of the Order of Merit

References

 
1929 establishments in Portugal
Merit (Portugal), Order of
Merit (Portugal), Order of
Awards established in 1929